The Baltyr-Khan Forest Reserve (also Балтыркан Baltyrkan) is located in the Avletim rural community, Aksy District, Jalal-Abad Region, Kyrgyzstan. Established in 1975, it covers 304 hectares. Its purpose is conservation of Siberian Fir (Abies sibirica var. semenovii). Among other trees growing in the forest reserve are Schrenk's Spruce (Picea schrenkiana subsp. tianshanica), Persian walnut (Juglans regia), maple (Acer tataricum ssp. semenovii), wild apple (Malus sieversii), etc.

References

Protected areas established in 1975
Forest reserves of Kyrgyzstan
1975 establishments in the Kirghiz Soviet Socialist Republic